Yinfeng line of Ningbo Rail Transit, also known as Ningbo–Fenghua Intercity Railway, Ningfeng line or Line S3, is a rapid transit line in Ningbo. It starts from Gaotang Bridge station in Yinzhou District and ends in Jinhai Road station in Fenghua District. Through train service is operated on both Line 3 and the Ningfeng Line. Construction of Ningfeng Line started on December 30, 2015. The initial section of the line (3 stations) opened on September 28, 2019. The remaining section of the line (6 stations) opened on September 27, 2020.

Route
The railway starts south of Gaotang Bridge station in south Yinzhou District, goes south until it reaches the Ningbo Ring Expressway and turns into an elevated line and enters the Huanzhen North Road of Jiangshan Town. After reaching Jiangshan Station, it turns east into Yanhu Road and passes Yinzhou Industrial Park and Yongjiang Village until it reaches Fangqiao and turns south again along Donghuan Road before it reaches its destination, Jinhai Road Station. 

The section between Fangqiao to Dacheng stations is an elevated structure that will run under the elevated south extension of the Ningbo Airport Expressway, forming a three level structure similar to the northern section of Shanghai Metro Line 1.

Future plans propose that the line will be divided at Fangqiao station: the northern part will be integrated into Line 3 and the southern part will be extended northwards until it finally reaches Jinfang station of Line 5. A further extension southwards into Ninghai County and a branch line west to Xikou Town have also been proposed.

Opening timeline

Stations

References

2019 establishments in China
Railway lines opened in 2019
Ningbo Rail Transit lines